Aeroporto is the terminal station on the Red Line of the Lisbon Metro. The station was built to serve Lisbon Airport.

The station, designed by the architect Leopoldo de Almeida Rosa, opened on July 17, 2012 in conjunction with the Encarnação and Moscavide stations, as part of the expansion of the line to serve Lisbon Portela Airport.

Connections

Urban buses

Carris 
 208 Cais do Sodré ⇄ Estação Oriente (Interface) (morning service)
 705 Estação Oriente (Interface) ⇄ Estação Roma-Areeiro
 722 Praça de Londres ⇄ Portela - Rua dos Escritores
 744 Marquês de Pombal ⇄ Moscavide (Quinta das Laranjeiras)
 783 Amoreiras (Centro Comercial) ⇄ Portela - Rua Mouzinho de Albuquerque

Aerobus 
 Linha 1 Aeroporto ⇄ Cais do Sodré
 Linha 2 Aeroporto ⇄ Sete Rios

Suburban buses

Rodoviária de Lisboa 
 312 Lisboa (Campo Grande) circulação via Charneca
 313 Lisboa (Campo Grande) circulação via Sacavém
 319 Lisboa (Areeiro) ⇄ Alverca (Zona Industrial)
 320 Lisboa (Areeiro) ⇄ Alverca (Estação) via Forte da Casa
 321 Lisboa (Areeiro) ⇄ Via Rara
 329 Lisboa (Campo Grande) ⇄ Quinta da Piedade

See also
 List of Lisbon metro stations

References

External links

Red Line (Lisbon Metro) stations
Railway stations opened in 2012